Shawn Brown (born February 27, 1987) is a Jamaican-born former soccer player who played as a midfielder and defender.

Career

Early career 
Brown began playing with the Toronto-based Serbian White Eagles in the interprovincial Canadian Soccer League in 2010. After a single season with the Serbs, he signed with expansion franchise Mississauga Eagles. He would record his first goal for the club on June 17, 2011, against London City. The Eagles would successfully secure a postseason berth by finishing seventh in the First Division. Brown would feature in the opening round of the playoffs where Mississauga was eliminated from the competition by Toronto Croatia.  

In 2012, he would sign with the newly promoted SC Waterloo Region. The club narrowly failed in clinching a playoff berth after finishing ninth in the division with a single-point difference. He re-signed with Waterloo for the 2013 season. The club would secure a postseason berth by finishing fifth in the First Division. He participated in the CSL Championship final where Waterloo defeated divisional champions Kingston FC for the title. After the conclusion of the Bosnian football season, he returned to Waterloo for the summer of 2014 but would be loaned out to Toronto Croatia for the majority of the season.

NK Travnik 
In the winter of 2014, he played abroad in the Premier League of Bosnia and Herzegovina with NK Travnik. He made his debut for Travnik on March 15, 2014, against Leotar Trebinje.

Toronto Croatia  
Following his return to Waterloo for the 2014 season he was loaned out to league rivals Toronto Croatia. He assisted the Croats in securing a playoff berth by finishing as runner-up in the First Division. In the second round of the postseason, he contributed a goal against Kingston which advanced Toronto to the championship finals. He was featured in the championship final against York Region Shooters where he recorded a goal for Croatia but was defeated in a penalty shootout. 

For the 2015 season, he would permanently sign with Toronto Croatia. Once again he assisted the Croats in clinching a playoff berth by finishing second in the standings. In the preliminary round of the postseason, he recorded a goal against Milton SC which assisted Croatia in advancing to the next round. For the third time in his career, he participated in the championship final against his former team Waterloo where Toronto successfully claimed the title.

Later career 
In 2016, he split the season by playing with both York Region Shooters and North Mississauga SC. In his debut season with North Mississauga, he appeared in 13 matches and recorded 2 goals. He was also selected to the League1 Ontario West All-Star team where he recorded a goal in the All-Star Game. 

From 2017 to 2021, he played with Master's FA where he appeared in 36 regular season matches, scoring 4 goals, and 6 playoff matches. In 2019, he helped Master's FA win the League1 championship after defeating FC London. He would feature in the country's national cup tournament against York United FC in the 2021 Canadian Championship.

Indoor career  
In the winter of 2017, he played indoor soccer with Croatia AC in the Arena Premier League. The following indoor season he signed with expansion side Mississauga MetroStars of the Major Arena Soccer League. He recorded his first for the club on March 17, 2019, against Utica City FC. In total he would appear in 14 matches and recorded 1 goal.

References  
 

Living people
1987 births
Association football midfielders
Association football defenders
Jamaican footballers
Serbian White Eagles FC players
Mississauga Eagles FC players
SC Waterloo Region players
NK Travnik players
Toronto Croatia players
York Region Shooters players
North Mississauga SC players
Master's FA players
Mississauga MetroStars players
Canadian Soccer League (1998–present) players
Premier League of Bosnia and Herzegovina players
League1 Ontario players
Major Arena Soccer League players